Murray Arnold (March 4, 1938 – November 13, 2012) was an American basketball coach, best remembered for his college coaching career at Chattanooga, Western Kentucky and Stetson.  He also spent two seasons from 1991 coaching the Perth Wildcats of Australia's National Basketball League. In 1991, he led them to a championship.

Arnold started his coaching career at the high school level in the United States, winning a Class A Florida state championship with DeLand High School in DeLand, Florida.  Arnold worked his way up to the college level, where he coached at the University of Tennessee at Chattanooga, Western Kentucky University, and Stetson University.  He also coached at the junior college level for one season, winning a NJCAA national championship at Okaloosa-Walton Community College.

Arnold died of cancer on November 13, 2012.

References

1938 births
2012 deaths
American expatriate basketball people in Australia
American men's basketball coaches
Basketball coaches from Maryland
Chattanooga Mocs men's basketball coaches
Chicago Bulls assistant coaches
College men's basketball head coaches in the United States
Deaths from cancer in Florida
High school basketball coaches in Florida
Junior college men's basketball coaches in the United States
Mississippi State Bulldogs men's basketball coaches
People from University Park, Maryland
Stetson Hatters men's basketball coaches
Western Kentucky Hilltoppers basketball coaches